Gregory Alan Best (born July 23, 1964, in Lynchburg, Virginia) is an equestrian competitor and coach in the sport of show jumping who won two silver medals for the United States in the 1988 Summer Olympic Games in Seoul, South Korea riding the famous Gem Twist. In 1992, Best suffered a fall that shattered his shoulder. After this, he moved to New Zealand, where he rode for the New Zealand League, winning the World Cup Series. He has also served as a New Zealand National Show Jumping Selector, a National Show Jumping Coach and a member of the New Zealand Show Jumping High Performance Committee. Best coached New Zealand's jumpers for the 2004 Summer Olympic Games in Athens. Between 1987 and 2003, Best also garnered 6 FEI World Cup wins. He now conducts coaching clinics in the United States, Canada and New Zealand. Along with Gem Twist, horses named Santos and Entrepreneur have been among his champion mounts.

Best graduated from Gill St. Bernard's School in 1982. He has been a resident of Flemington, New Jersey.

Accomplishments 

 1984 – Won the North American Young Rider Championships
 1985 – USET Talent Derby
 1986 – USET Foundation Lionel Guerrand-Hermès Memorial Award
 1987 – American Grand Prix Association Champion, Grand Prix of Florida, Grand Prix of Tampa
 1987 – Team silver Pan American Games
 1988 – Individual and team silver for show jumping in Seoul Summer Olympic Games
 1990 – Final four in the World Equestrian Games
 2001/2002 season – winner FEI World Cup Jumping – Pacific League – New Zealand

References

1964 births
Living people
American show jumping riders
American male equestrians
Gill St. Bernard's School alumni
People from Flemington, New Jersey
Sportspeople from Lynchburg, Virginia
Sportspeople from Hunterdon County, New Jersey
Equestrians at the 1988 Summer Olympics
Olympic silver medalists for the United States in equestrian
Medalists at the 1988 Summer Olympics
Pan American Games medalists in equestrian
Pan American Games silver medalists for the United States
Equestrians at the 1987 Pan American Games
Medalists at the 1987 Pan American Games